Girona is a province of Spain, in the northeastern part of the autonomous community of Catalonia. It is bordered on the northwest by the province of Lleida, on the southwest by the province of Barcelona, on the north by France (Pyrénées-Orientales), and on the east by the Mediterranean Sea.

The population of the province in 2016 was 739,607. Its capital and largest city is Girona, with an urban area (including the neighbouring municipalities of Salt, Sarrià de Ter and Vilablareix) representing, with a total population of 144,709, 19.2% of the population. The Girona area acts as an industrial, commercial and service hub for a significant part of the province.

Municipalities of Girona
The province has 222 municipalities, including Girona city (population 96,722), Figueres (pop. 44,765), Lloret de Mar (pop. 40,282), Blanes (pop. 39,834), Olot (33,725), Salt (pop. 30,389), Palafrugell (pop. 22,816) and Sant Feliu de Guíxols (pop. 21,814), as well as some significant and historical towns such as Banyoles, Besalú, Cadaqués, Camprodon, Palamós, Puigcerdà or Ripoll.

The municipality of Llívia, which is an exclave separated from the rest of Spain and surrounded by France, is also officially part of this province.

Comarques of Girona
Since the division by provinces in Spain and the division by comarques in Catalonia do not completely match, the term comarques of the province of Girona is not accurate. However, a list of the comarques that are included—totally or partially—in the province of Girona can be made:

 Fully included:
 l'Alt Empordà
 el Baix Empordà
 la Garrotxa
 el Gironès
 el Pla de l'Estany
 el Ripollès
 Partially included:
 la Selva (all municipalities except Fogars de la Selva)
 la Cerdanya (only its eastern half)
 Osona (this comarca is generally not listed as part of Girona, since only three of its municipalities are part of this province: Espinelves, Vidrà and Viladrau)

Population
The historical population is given in the following chart:

See also
List of municipalities in Girona

Notes and references

External links 

 news and information of the province of Girona
 Xanascat the National Network of Youth Hostels of Catalonia
 rural tourism in Girona
 Tourism guide of Girona province, Hotels, Restaurants, Guides, Campings & more of Girona
 An excentric guide to Girona province